Now 08 is a compilation CD released under EMI Music Australia in 2005. It has a slightly different design to the Now CDs before it.

Track listing
 The Wrights – "Evie (Part 1)" (3:56)
 Kylie Minogue – "I Believe in You" (3:19)
 Simple Plan – "Welcome to My Life" (3:24)
 Missy Higgins – "Ten Days" (3:45)
 Inaya Day – "Nasty Girl" (3:13)
 Cabin Crew – "Star2Fall" (2:47)
 Uniting Nations – "Out of Touch" (2:47)
 Joel Turner and the Modern Day Poets featuring Anthony Mundine – "Knock U Out" (3:44)
 Chingy – "Balla Baby" (3:33)
 Kelis featuring André 3000 – "Millionaire" (3:44)
 Scribe – "Dreaming" (4:17)
 Hilary Duff – "Fly" (3:44) 
 Thirsty Merc – "Someday, Someday" (3:40) 
 Fabolous – "Breathe" (3:32)
 Estelle – "Free" (3:22)
 Eskimo Joe – "Older Than You" (2:32)
 Jamelia – "Stop" (3:37)
 Evermore – "For One Day" (4:20)
 Ryan Cabrera – "On the Way Down" (3:32)
 Robbie Williams – "Misunderstood" (4:01)
 StoneBridge featuring Therese – "Put 'Em High" (3:28)
 The Chemical Brothers – "Galvanize" (4:28)

2005 compilation albums
EMI Records compilation albums
Now That's What I Call Music! albums (Australian series)